The 2010 Jacksonville Jaguars season was the franchise's 16th season in the National Football League and the 8th under head coach Jack Del Rio. The Jaguars, who were in their second year of "rebuilding" under general manager Gene Smith, improved upon their 7–9 record from 2009, but narrowly missed the playoffs with an 8–8 record. Although blackouts were a problem in 2009 for the franchise, they sold out all of their 2010 home games.

Offseason

Acquisitions 
 WR Kassim Osgood, free agent signed on March 6, 2010.
 DE Aaron Kampman, free agent signed on March 7, 2010.
 LB Kirk Morrison, acquired in trade on April 24, 2010.
 LB Freddy Keiaho, free agent signed on  April 30, 2010.
  G Justin Smiley, acquired in trade on May 25, 2010.

Departures 
 WR Torry Holt, released on February 11, 2010.
 OT Tra Thomas, released on February 11, 2010.
 DT Rob Meier, released on February 11, 2010.
 DT John Henderson, released on April 26, 2010.
 LB Brian Iwuh, released on April 26, 2010.
 DT Montavious Stanley, released on April 26, 2010.
 LB Clint Ingram, declared free agent.
 RB Allen Patrick, released on May 25, 2010.
 DE Reggie Hayward, released on July 7, 2010.

Trades 
 DE Quentin Groves was traded to the Oakland Raiders for a 5th round pick in the 2010 NFL Draft.
 The Jaguars traded their 4th round pick (108 overall) to the Oakland Raiders for a 5th round pick (153 overall) and LB Kirk Morrison.
 The Jaguars traded their 5th round pick (158 overall) to the New Orleans Saints for a 4th round pick in the 2011 NFL Draft.

Draft

Staff

Final roster

Schedule

Preseason

Regular season 

Note: Intra-division opponents are in bold text.

Standings

Game summaries

Week 1: vs. Denver Broncos

Week 2: at San Diego Chargers

Week 3: vs. Philadelphia Eagles

Week 4: vs. Indianapolis Colts

Week 5: at Buffalo Bills

Week 6: vs. Tennessee Titans

Week 7: at Kansas City Chiefs

Week 8: at Dallas Cowboys

Week 9: Bye

Week 10: vs. Houston Texans

Week 11: vs. Cleveland Browns

Week 12: at New York Giants

Week 13: at Tennessee Titans

Week 14: vs. Oakland Raiders

Week 15: at Indianapolis Colts

Week 16: vs. Washington Redskins

Week 17: at Houston Texans

References

Jacksonville
Jacksonville Jaguars seasons
Jackson